Persegaf stands for Persatuan Sepakbola Pegunungan Arfak is an Indonesian football club based in Arfak Mountains Regency, West Papua that competes in Liga 3 and play their home match at Irai Stadium.

References

Football clubs in Indonesia
Football clubs in West Papua (province)